Williamnagar, formerly known as Simsanggre, is the headquarters of East Garo Hills district in the state of Meghalaya in India.

History
Williamnagar, the headquarters complex of the East Garo Hills district of Meghalaya, one of the states of North-Eastern India, was christened after Captain Williamson A. Sangma, the founding Chief Minister of the State of Meghalaya. The township was planned around the erstwhile village of Simsanggre, on the vast plainlands along the bank of the Simsang River, in 1976 after the Garo Hills district of yesteryear was re-organised to carve out a new district called East Garo Hills District.

The place where Williamnagar is situated has historical importance as it was here that the Garos made their last major resistance to the British intrusion into Garo Hills during the year 1837. The legendary Garo leader Pa Togan Nengminja Sangma was felled by the British, in skirmish, at Chisobibra, on the outskirts of Williamnagar, on 12 December 1837.

Demographics
 India census, Williamnagar had a population of 18,251. Males constitute 52% of the population and females 48%. Williamnagar has an average literacy rate of 67%, higher than the national average of 59.5%: male literacy is 71%, and female literacy is 64%. In Williamnagar, 18% of the population is under 6 years of age.

Places of interest 
Pa.Togan N Sangma Memorial Park, Chisobibra
Simsang River
Jadi Dare Park
Chibok Dare(Falls)
Mrik Wari
Rongon (Swimming)
Me Dare(Falls)
Gitcham(old) Balpakram
Bansamgre Picnic Spot
Bansamgre Fish Sanctuary
Nengmandal Fish Sanctuary
Do.be Dare(Falls)

Schools and colleges 
Schools
Sacred Heart Higher Secondary School, Nengsanggre
Rongrenggiri Govt. Higher Secondary School, Kusimkolgre
Rongrenggiri Model Secondary School, Rongreng-Chidekgre
Bolkinggre Secondary School, Bolkinggre
Williamnagar Girls Secondary School, Super Market 
Peneul Secondary School, Mount Penuel
Sunbeam Secondary School, Tambo A'ding
Educere Higher Secondary School, Kusimkolgre
Green Hill Secondary School, Balsrigittim
Greenyard Secondary School, Fishery Colony
Trinity Secondary School, Kusimkol
Jawahar Navodaya Vidyalaya Samgong
Williamnagar Vidya Mandir Secondary School, Super Market
Simsanggre Secondary School, DC Old Colony
Balsrigittim MP Secondary School, Balsrigittim
Riverdale Secondary School, Main Bazar
Loyola Higher Secondary School, Dawagre  
Ferrando Memorial Secondary School, New Denggagre
Colleges
Williamnagar Govt. College, Nokgil A'we
Ramsang College, Kusimkolgre
Loyola College, New Denggagre

Localities 
 Baija Kusimkol
 Baija
 Samgongre
 Damagre
 Chisobibra
 Chidekgre
 Rangmal Badim
 Kusimkolgre
 Nokil A·we
 Nengsangre
 Balsrigittim
 DC Colony
 Fishery Colony 
 PWD Colony
 Kolmesalgre
 Irrigation Colony
 Main Bazar
 Cinema Hall - Super Market 
 Medical Colony 
 Tambo A·ding  
 Dobetkolgre
 Denggagre 
 Dawagre
 Warimagre
 Sampalgre
 Chiokgre
 Asiragre
 Nengmandalgre
 Chachatgre
 Rongongre
Bolkingre

References

External links
East Garo Hills District Administration Official Website

East Garo Hills district
Cities and towns in East Garo Hills district